Ultraviolet light therapy or ultraviolet phototherapy is a form of treatment for certain skin disorders including atopic skin disorder and vitiligo when used with psoralen to form the PUVA treatment.  It consists of irradiation of the patient with the UVA band of ultraviolet light (fairly closely matching the ultraviolet output from the sun), usually delivered from a fluorescent bulb specially designed to output this frequency of ultraviolet.

This treatment is similar to the light from good quality solariums but differs from the mainly UVB ultraviolet band used to treat psoriasis. Tanning beds are used both in dermatology practices for the treatment of cosmetic skin conditions (such as psoriasis, acne, eczema and vitiligo) and in indoor tanning salons for cosmetic tanning.

Typical treatment regimens involve short exposure to UVB rays 3 to 5 times a week at a hospital or clinic, and repeated sessions may be required before results are noticeable. Almost all of the conditions that respond to UVB light are chronic problems, so continuous treatment is required to keep those problems in check. Home UVB systems are common solutions for those whose conditions respond to treatment. Home systems permit patients to treat themselves every other day (the ideal treatment regimen for most) without the frequent, costly trips to the office/clinic and back.

Side effects
Side-effects may include itching and redness of the skin due to UVB exposure, and possibly sunburn, if patients do not minimize exposure to natural UV rays during treatment days. Cataracts can frequently develop if the eyes are not protected from UVB light exposure. To date, there is no link between an increase in a patient's risk of skin cancer and the proper use of narrow-band UVB phototherapy. "Proper use" is generally defined as reaching the "Sub-Erythemic Dose" (S.E.D.), the maximum amount of UVB your skin can receive without burning.
Certain fungal growths under the toenail can be treated using a specific wavelength of UV delivered from a high-power LED (light-emitting diode) and can be safer than traditional systemic drugs.

Phototherapy for neonatal jaundice in infants uses blue light, not UV.

See also
 Indoor tanning
 Light therapy

References

Dermatologic procedures